Andrea Graus (born 13 November 1979) is an Austrian racing cyclist. She has won the Austrian National Road Race Championships five times. She competed in the 2012 UCI women's road race in Valkenburg aan de Geul and in the 2013 UCI women's road race in Florence.

References

External links
 
 

1979 births
Living people
Austrian female cyclists
Sportspeople from Innsbruck
21st-century Austrian women